Wang Ju (born 1 September 1992), as known as Naomi Wang, is a Chinese singer. She participated in the 2018 Chinese reality television show Produce 101 and rose to fame quickly due to her individualistic and unique style.

Early life 
Wang was born in Shanghai, China. She loved dancing since she was a child, so her parents sent her to the Children's Palace to learn dance. She studied in Shanghai No. 3 Girls' High School. When she was 15 years old, she forfeited her entrance to an art college due to an accident whereby her body lost shape due to the use of hormones. She studied at Shanghai Normal University, majoring in art education. After graduating from college, she has worked as a primary school teacher, trainer, and headhunter.

Career

2017: Pre-debut 
In February 2017, Wang joined esee model management (Shanghai Yingmo Culture Development Co., Ltd.) and became a field agent, mainly responsible for interviewing with models, helping to deal with problems between models and clients, and she is also responsible for translation, team performance, backstage management during fashion week, follow-up rehearsal, etc. before becoming a model manager.

2018: On-screen debut 
In 2018, she participated in Tencent Video's Produce 101 as trainee. During this period, not only did she participate in singing the theme song "Produce 101" of the same name, but also co-written and sang "Mulan Says" with her teammates. However, she was eliminated from the show on the final episode ranking 15 in place. On, July 6, she participated in Zhejiang Television's Keep Running Carnival and paired up with Chen He to do a mini talk-show "贤言菊语".September 14, the promotional song "Aiya Aunt" for the film "Hello, Mrs. Money" was officially released. On September 10, she participated in the 2019 New York Fashion Week。 On October 26, she won Ifeng Fashion Choics's Personality Pioneer Award. On November 4, she participated in "Perfect Restaurant" as a regular member. On November 26, she released her first English single "WORK FOR ME".

2019 - Present

2019 
On January 17, she released her highest charting single "Te Quiero" which spend 11 weeks in the China Top 40. On January 11, she and Li Zixuan, Liu Renyu, Gao Yingxi, Qi Yandi, Lu Xiaoyu and Kimberley Chen formed a temporary group as "Breeze Girls" and sang the theme song "Breeze" for the movie "The New King of Comedy". In May, she participated in Hunan Television's Day Day Up as a guest. On August 14, she received the award for Beijing Pop Music Award as Best Newcomer of the Year. On December 19, her first movie with her as the main lead "Ladies in Beijing was released on Youku.

2020 
On February 23 she participated in Dragon Television's Top Funny Comedian Season VI as a guest. Currently, she is attending New York Film Academy in Los Angeles.

Discography

Singles

Filmography

Television shows

Movies

References

21st-century Chinese women singers
Participants in Chinese reality television series
Living people
1992 births